Beitar Kafr Kanna is an Israeli football club based in Kafr Kanna. The club currently plays in Liga Bet North A division.

History
The club played mostly in the lower divisions of Israeli football until promoting to Liga Bet, then fifth tier, at the end if the 2003–04 season. The club played in Liga Bet for five seasons, relegating at the end of the 2008–09 season. In 2015 the club won its division and was promoted back to Liga Bet.

Honours

League

External links
Beitar Kafr Kanna Raduan The Israel Football Association

References

Football clubs in Israel
Betar football clubs
Kafr Kanna
Arab-Israeli football clubs